Two Colors (1989), in Ukrainian Два Кольори - Ukrainian symphonic folk album by Kvitka Cisyk. The title comes from one of the songs, "Two Colors" by A. Bilash.

Track listing
"Де ти тепер" (Where are you now?) /music: Ігор Шамо, lyrics: Дмитро Луценко/ – 3:36
"Черемшина" (Spring's song) /music: Василь Михайлюк, lyrics: Микола Юрійчук/ – 4:15
"Коломийка" (A dance) /music & lyrics: народні/ – 2:36
"Тече річка" (The river flows) /music & lyrics: народні/ – 3:06
"При ватрі" (A campfire at dusk) /music: Юрій Старосольський, lyrics: Юрій Пясецький/ – 3:08
"Я піду в далекі гори" (I will go to the distant hills) /music & lyrics: Volodymyr Ivasyuk/ – 6:17
"Ой заграли музики" (Musicians are playing) /music & lyrics: народні/ – 3:04
"Два кольори" (Two colors) /music: Олександр Білаш, lyrics: Dmytro Pavlychko/ – 5:11
"Кохання" (Love) /music: Ігор Білозір, lyrics: Петро Запотічний/ – 4:17
"Верше, мій верше" /music & lyrics: народні/ – 5:01
"Колись дівчино мила" (The Nightingale) /music & lyrics: народні/ – 2:00
"І снилося" (A young girl's dream) /music & lyrics: народні/ – 1:24
"На городі керниченька" (The well) /music & lyrics: народні/ – 0:43
"Ой не світи місяченьку" (A song to the moon) /music & lyrics: народні/ – 2:05
"Журавлі" (The cranes are flying) /music: Лев Лепкий, lyrics: Bohdan Lepky/ – 4:15

Personnel
All vocals by: Kvitka Cisyk 
Classical and Steel String guitars: S.Scharf
Solo Piano: Maria Cisyk
drums: Ronnie Zito 
Acoustic bass: John Beal
Piano and Celeste: Kenneth Ascher, Pat Rebillot
Harp: Margaret Ross
Percussion: Sue Evans
synthesizers: J.Lawrence
Clarinet Solo: Eddie Daniels
Concertmaster: M.Ellen
Violins: A.Ajemian etc.
Violas: J.Barber etc. 
Cello: E.Moye etc. 
Executive producer: Ed Rakowicz 
Produced by: Ed Rakowicz, Jack Cortner
Arranged and Conducted by: Jack Cortner 
Digitally Recorded and Mixed by: Ed Rakowicz At Clinton Recording Studios, NYC 
Album Coordinator: D.Mounsey 
DDD. Manufactured in the United States. ISBN KMCD 1002

1989 albums
Folk albums by Ukrainian artists
Kvitka Cisyk albums